William Tanuwijaya (born 11 November 1981) is an Indonesian entrepreneur. He is the co-founder of  Tokopedia, an Indonesian technology company with a leading e-Commerce business. Tanuwijaya represents Indonesia as Young Global Leader at World Economic Forum. In 2019, he received Satyalancana Wira Karya or Medal of Honor from the President of Republic of Indonesia for his contribution to Indonesia's technology and economic growth.

Early life 
Tanuwijaya was born in Pematang Siantar, North Sumatra. He graduated from high school there, and his family was the middle income who supported his education. William went to college at Bina Nusantara University and later studied at the Harvard Kennedy School.

To pay for college William worked part time. He worked in an internet cafe twelve hours a day until he graduated in 2003. He then worked as a software developer in companies including TelkomSigma and Sqiva Sistem. He later worked as a game developer at Bolehnet. In 2006 Tanuwijaya worked as IT and Business Development Manager at Indocom Mediatama.

In 2007 William started to build Tokopedia, He asked his friend Leontinus Alpha Edison to join him as co-founder, an e-commerce startup that connects Indonesian buyers and sellers for free. At the same time his father was diagnosed with cancer. William has supported his family since that time.

William is one of the founders of Indonesia eCommerce Association (IdEA) and serves as a member of its supervisory board.

He married Felicia H.W. in November 2015.

Tokopedia 
On February 6, 2009, Tokopedia officially launched. At that year's Indonesia Celebration of Independence on August 17 Tokopedia opened for public access. In October 2014, Tokopedia received US$100million from  Softbank Internet and Media and Sequoia Capital. In 2016 Tanuwijaya represented Indonesia as a Young Global Leader at the World Economic Forum. Tokopedia announced its next stage of investment on August 17, 2017 for $1.1billion, from Alibaba Group.

References

External links 

 Profile at Merdeka.com
 Profile at Viva.co.id
 
 
 

1981 births
Living people
Indonesian businesspeople
Indonesian people of Chinese descent
People from Pematangsiantar